{{family name hatnote|Al-Alawi (Arabic patronymic surname), and her middle name is Marbella (Philippine matronymic surname)}}
Mona Marbella Al-Alawi (Tagalog: [ˈmɔnɐ ɐˈlaʊɪ]; born 19 August 2004), formerly known as Mona Louise Rey, is a  Filipino actress and model. She is known for television series Munting Heredera (2011), Aso ni San Roque (2012), and Luna Blanca (2012) among others. Currently, she is homeschooling and usually gets involved in the vlogs of her prominent sister, Ivana Alawi.  

Career
Alawi was born in Manila, Philippines. She started her career in show business playing the title role of Jennifer Montereal in the hit GMA Network family drama Munting Heredera that aired for more than a year.that aired for more than a year. Gloria Romero joins cast of Kapuso teleserye directed by Maryo J. de los Reyes She then portrayed the role of Fatima Salvador, a blind girl with a golden heart who is an offspring of a mortal and a manananggal, in the same network's fantaserye Aso ni San Roque''.

Personal life
Mona Alawi is the youngest of four siblings born to a Filipino mother, Fatima Marbella, and a Moroccan father, Samier Al-Alawi. Alawi's mother separated from her father when she was pregnant with her and went to Manila in 2004. Alawi's mother left her three older children with their father; Alawi would not be reunited with her in Manila until 2006.

Alawi suffers from Type 1 diabetes, a disease she was diagnosed with in 2011, the year she started her career in show business. She is the only one in her family who suffers from the illness. As a result, she has to maintain a strict daily regimen of insulin self-injections and avoiding foods and drinks rich in sugar and carbohydrates.

Alawi and her family are born again Christians. One of her older sisters, Ivana Alawi, is an actress and social media influencer with over millions of followers.

Filmography

Film

Television

Awards and nominations

References

External links

GMA Network profile

2004 births
Living people
Actresses from Manila
Filipino child actresses
Filipino Christians
Filipino evangelicals
Filipino female models
Filipino Pentecostals
Filipino people of Moroccan descent
Filipino television actresses
GMA Network personalities
Tagalog people